Jardel Pizzinato (born 10 February 1978) is a Brazilian handball player who competed in the 2008 Summer Olympics.

References

1978 births
Living people
Brazilian male handball players
Olympic handball players of Brazil
Handball players at the 2008 Summer Olympics
Handball players at the 2003 Pan American Games
Handball players at the 2007 Pan American Games
Pan American Games medalists in handball
Pan American Games gold medalists for Brazil
Medalists at the 2007 Pan American Games
21st-century Brazilian people